The III Central American Games (Spanish: III Juegos Deportivos Centroamericanos) was a multi-sport event that took place between 4–10 January 1986.  
Initially, the Games were scheduled for 1981 in Managua, Nicaragua, but were
cancelled due to the unstable political situation.

The Games were called the "Peace Games" (Spanish: Juegos de la Paz).
  The official song was the "Hymn of the Peace Games" (Spanish: Himno de los Juegos de la Paz) composed by Alfonso Agulló.

Long distance runner Mateo Flores was honoured to light the torch in the stadium bearing his name.
 
A complete list of medal winners can be found on the MásGoles webpage
(click on "JUEGOS CENTROAMERICANOS" in the low right corner).

Participation
Athletes from 5 countries were reported to participate:

Sports
The competition featured 20 sports (plus badminton, rowing, and sailing as exhibition).

Aquatic sports
 Swimming
 Water polo
 Athletics
 Badminton†
 Baseball
 Basketball
 Bowling
 Boxing
 Chess
 Cycling
 Equestrian
 Fencing
 Football
 Gymnastics
 Judo
 Rowing†
 Sailing†
 Shooting
 Softball
 Table tennis
 Tennis
 Volleyball
 Weightlifting
 Wrestling

†: Exhibition event

Medal table 
The table below is taken from El Diario de Hoy, San Salvador, El Salvador, and from El Nuevo Diario, Managua, Nicaragua.

References 

Central American Games
Central American Games
International sports competitions hosted by Guatemala
Central American Games
Cent
Multi-sport events in Guatemala